Kamel Madoun (c. 1960 – 27 November 2020) was an Algerian handball player and coach. After spending his playing career with NA Hussein Dey and the Algerian national team, he became a coach, leading several teams in Algeria and abroad.

Awards

Player
Bronze Medal in the African Men's Junior Handball Championship (1980)

Coach
Finalist in the Algerian Handball Cup (2008)
Winner of the Oman Handball Championship (2009, 2019)
Winner of the Saudi Arabian Handball Championship (2010)
Finalist in the Arab Handball Championship of Champions (2013)
Finalist in the Oman Handball Super Cup (2018)

References

Algerian male handball players
Algerian handball coaches
1960 births
2020 deaths
Year of birth uncertain
21st-century Algerian people